Projekt is a Portland, Oregon-based independent record label started by Sam Rosenthal in 1983. Projekt releases music in the styles of darkwave, ambient, shoegaze, gothic rock, ethereal, dream-pop, and dark cabaret. Projekt artists include Sam Rosenthal's own Black Tape for a Blue Girl, Steve Roach, Voltaire, Erik Wøllo, Unto Ashes, Weep (Doc Hammer, co-writer of the Adult Swim show The Venture Bros.), Mira, and Android Lust.

History
Based over the years in South Florida, Los Angeles, Chicago, and Brooklyn, Projekt is now located in Portland, Oregon. Projekt had released 305 titles as of summer 2014, with an additional 25 physical CDs on the Projekt: Archive (formerly Relic) sub-label. Archive also is the home to an additional 85 digital titles. Popmatters wrote of the label, "Founded in 1983 by Sam Rosenthal, Projekt concentrated on releasing dream-pop, neoclassical, ambient, gothic rock and shoegaze bands, and Rosenthal’s own group, Black Tape for a Blue Girl, was an early exponent of darkwave’s hallmark mournful cabaret.”

Label support of digital sales
Sam Rosenthal is a strong supporter of MP3 and digital downloads. While Rosenthal has ensured that digital files of his artists are available for legitimate download, in the early days of MP3s he also praised downloads even when not accessed via official channels. Editorials on the Projekt Web site (dating back to January 2001) countered the assumption that all labels oppose all unofficial MP3 downloads. While Rosenthal did not condone downloading entire albums without paying, his view is that those exposed to music, by whatever route, will ultimately purchase albums and support the artists they enjoy. In the ensuing years, his views have changed and now he speaks out against unauthorized downloading. After the January 20, 2012, takedown of Megaupload, Rosenthal went on to speak out about how artists can get their files taken down, and in support of the DoJ shut-down of sites hosting illegal music.

Projektfest
Projekt Records also presents Projektfest, a semi-annual festival of gothic and ethereal music, featuring primarily (but not exclusively) Projekt artists. In 1996, Projektfest ran for two days in Chicago. In 1997, Chicago was again host to two days of Projektfest and a few weeks later another day of performances were hosted in Mexico City. In 1998, Projektfest was a series of four one-day events in Los Angeles, Chicago, Philadelphia, and New York City. The 2002 Projektfest was held over three days in Philadelphia, at the Trocadero and other sites. Projekt hosted Projektfest '07 as part of the Blacksun Festival in New Haven, Connecticut, in August. Projektfest'10 was held July 30 & 31, 2010. Projektfest '11 was held November 12, 2011, at The Middle East (nightclub) in Cambridge, MA, featuring the artists Voltaire, Black Tape for a Blue Girl, and Weep.

Notable artist

Current roster

 Alio Die
 All My Faith Lost...
 As Lonely As Dave Bowman
 Black Tape for a Blue Girl
 deepspace (AU)
 Forrest Fang
 Katzenjammer Kabarett
 Lovesliescrushing
 Mercury's Antennae
 Mark A. Michaels & Patricia Johnson
 Mirabilis
 Revue Noir
 Sam Rosenthal
 Steve Roach
 Soriah
 Soul Whirling Somewhere
 Unto Ashes
 Vidna Obmana
 Voltaire
 Erik Wøllo
 theAdelaidean

Past roster

 Amber Route
 Android Lust
 Arcanta
 Arcana
 Area
 Attrition 
 Audra
 The Arms of Someone New
 Autumn's Grey Solace
 Controlled Bleeding
 Dark Sanctuary
 Eden
 Every silver lining has a cloud
 Faith & Disease
 Fear Falls Burning
 Jeff Greinke
 Lisa Hammer
 Human Drama
 Judgment of Paris
 Khvarena
 Love Spirals Downwards
 Lovespirals
 lowsunday
 Lux Interna
 Lycia
 Makaras Pen
 Mira
 Mors Syphilitica
 Mortiis
 O Yuki Conjugate
 Ordo Equitum Solis
 Radiana
 Shinjuku Thief
 Slap
 Tearwave
 Thanatos
 The Sleep of Reason
 The Twilight Garden
 This Ascension
 Peter Ulrich
 Tara VanFlower
 Weep

References

External links
 

Ambient music record labels
Goth record labels
American independent record labels
Record labels established in 1983